Thomas Aloysius Finlay (17 September 1922 – 3 December 2017) was an Irish judge, politician and barrister who served as Chief Justice of Ireland and a Judge of the Supreme Court from 1985 to 1994, President of the High Court from 1974 to 1985 and a Judge of the High Court from 1971 to 1985. He served as a Teachta Dála (TD) for the Dublin South-Central constituency from 1954 to 1957.

Early life 
He was the second son of Thomas Finlay, a politician and senior counsel whose career was cut short by his early death in 1932. He was educated at Clongowes Wood College, University College Dublin (UCD) and King's Inns. While attending UCD, he was elected Auditor of the University College Dublin Law Society. His older brother, William Finlay (1921–2010), was a governor of the Bank of Ireland.

Legal career 
He was called to the Bar in 1944, practicing on the Midlands circuit and became a senior counsel in 1961.

He successfully defended Capt James Kelly in the 1970 arms trial.

In 1971, he was tasked by the Fianna Fáil government with representing the Republic of Ireland before the European Commission of Human Rights, when, in response to the ill treatment of detainees by security forces in Northern Ireland, they charged the British government with torture. Despite the notional recourse such prisoners would have within the British legal system, the Commission ruled the complaint admissible.

He was subsequently appointed a Judge of the High Court, and after its expansion in 1974 he was promoted to President of the High Court. In 1985, Taoiseach Garret FitzGerald nominated him to the Supreme Court and Chief Justice of Ireland. On 10 October 1985, he was appointed by President Patrick Hillery to both roles.

In this period he presided over a number of landmark cases, including the X case in 1992, when he overturned a High Court injunction preventing a pregnant teenage rape victim travelling to the UK for an abortion.

When, in the same year, the Justice Liam Hamilton, chair of the Beef Tribunal, sought disclosure of the cabinet's minutes for a particular meeting, Justice Finlay along with the majority of the Supreme Court denied the request ruling that the concept of collective government responsibility in the Constitution took precedence.

He announced his resignation and retirement in 1994.

Politics 
He was elected to Dáil Éireann as a Fine Gael TD for the Dublin South-Central constituency at the 1954 general election He lost his seat at the 1957 general election.

Retirement 
After his retirement, he presided over a number of public inquiries.

Landsdowne Road Riot Inquiry
In 1996 he oversaw the inquiry into the violence by English fans at the aborted 1995 friendly soccer match versus the Republic of Ireland at Lansdowne Road. His report to Bernard Allen, Minister for Sport, was critical of security arrangements on the night and recommended improvements to ticketing, seat-allocation, fan-vetting and policing arrangements.  The Irish Government shared his report with the British Home Office.

Commission on the Newspaper Industry
After the collapse of the Irish Press group in 1995, the Minister for Enterprise and Employment, John Bruton received a damming report from the Competition Authority that Independent Newspapers had abused its dominant position and acted in an anti-competitive manner by purchasing a shareholding in the Irish Press. In September 1995 Mr. Bruton announced the Commission on the Newspaper Industry with an extremely wide remit to examine diversity and ownership, competitiveness, editorial freedom and standards of coverage in Irish newspapers as well as the impact of the sales of the British press in Ireland.
Minister Bruton appointed 21 people to the commission and appointed Justice Finlay chair. 
Due to the wide remit and huge number of submissions the commission's report was delayed but was eventually published at the end of July recommending widespread reforms.

Tribunal of Inquiry into the Blood Transfusion Service Board
Following the discovery of the BTSB anti-D scandal, in 1996 Finlay was appointed the chair and singular member of the Tribunal of Inquiry into the Blood Transfusion Service Board.

The speed and efficiency with which Finlay's BTSB Tribunal conducted its business, restored confidence in the Tribunal as a mechanism of resolving great controversies in the public interest.

Sports Adjudication
He also sat on an IRFU panel to adjudicate on the cases of Rugby players accused of using banned performance-enhancing substances.

Personal life 
He was married to Alice Blayney, who predeceased him in 2012. They had five children, two of whom followed in his family's legal tradition; his son John being a Senior Counsel and his daughter Mary Finlay Geoghegan a former judge of the High Court, Court of Appeal and Supreme Court. Whenever his work schedule allowed, he would escape to County Mayo where he could indulge his passion for fishing.

Death 
Thomas Finlay died on 3 December 2017, aged 95.

Sources 
 Irish Times Obituary: Thomas Finlay, a considerate, patient and shrewd chief justice (Irish Times 6 December 2017)
 A man of common sense rather than abstract principle (Irish Times 18 October 1996) 
  Former Chief Justices of the Irish Supreme Court
 Report of the Tribunal of Inquiry into the Blood Transfusion Service Board (1997)

References

1922 births
2017 deaths
Fine Gael TDs
Members of the 15th Dáil
Politicians from County Dublin
Irish barristers
Presidents of the High Court (Ireland)
Alumni of University College Dublin
Chief justices of Ireland
People educated at Clongowes Wood College
Chairpersons of the Referendum Commission
Alumni of King's Inns